The 2015–2016 Cyclo-cross Superprestige events and season-long competition started on 4 October 2015 and concluded on 13 February 2016. Due to injury, defending champion Mathieu van der Poel missed the start of the season.

Results

Season standings
In each race, the top 15 riders gain points, going from 15 points for the winner decreasing by one point per position to 1 point for the rider finishing in 15th position. In case of ties in the total score of two or more riders, the following tie breakers exist: most races started, most races won, best result in the last race.

References

External links

S
S
Cyclo-cross Superprestige